Grinder is a surname. Notable people with the surname include:

John Grinder (born 1940), American linguist, author, management consultant, trainer, and speaker
Susanne Grinder (born 1981), Danish ballet dancer

See also
Grinder (disambiguation)
Griner